Yadagirigutta is a census town in Alair Assembly constituency of Yadadri Bhuvanagiri district of the Indian state of Telangana. It is a temple town as the famous Lakshmi Narasimha Temple is situated here. It is located at a distance of 16 Kms from the district headquarters Bhuvanagiri which is a part of Hyderabad Metropolitan Region and 55 Kms from Uppal, a major suburb of Hyderabad. The proposed Hyderabad Regional Ring Road passes through Yadagirigutta.

Demographics 
 India census, Yadagirigutta had a population of 13,267. Males constitute 50% of the population and females 50%. Yadagirigutta has an average literacy rate of 61%, less than the national average of 74.04%: male literacy is 71%, and female literacy is 52%. In Yadagirigutta, 13% of the population is under 6 years of age.

Transport 
Yadagirigutta is well connected by Rail and Road. Town is located at a distance of about 65 Kms from Mahatma Gandhi Bus Station and 82 Kms from Rajiv Gandhi International Airport at Hyderabad.Hyderabad MMTS is proposed to be extended from Ghatkesar to Yadagirigutta.

References 

Cities and towns in Yadadri Bhuvanagiri district
Mandal headquarters in Yadadri Bhuvanagiri district